State Nuclear Regulatory Inspectorate or SNRI is the central government executive authority responsible for formation and implementation of state policy in the field of nuclear safety. Formerly known as State Nuclear Regulatory Committee of Ukraine.

See also
Ministry of Energy and Coal Mining

References

External links

Independent agencies of the Ukrainian government